FK Vojvodina is a professional football club based in Novi Sad, Serbia.

Matches
Only official matches included (European Cup / Champions League, Cup Winners' Cup, UEFA Cup / Europa League & Inter-Cities Fairs Cup matches).

Overall record by country

As of 12 August 2021

References

External links
 Official website 
 FK Vojvodina at UEFA

Europe
Vojvodina
Vojvodina